Ghosts of Chosun (informal title: A Ghost Story of Joseon Dynasty) is a 1970 South Korean film directed by Shin Sang-ok.

Plot 
Prince Yeonsan-gun lusts after Yahwa, whose husband Yun Pil-u was executed after being branded a traitor. Yahwa chooses to take her own life in order to be reunited with Pil-u, but before she dies she asks her cat to take revenge for them. Afterwards, the bodies of court ladies and patrol guards are found dead in the palace every morning, and the ghosts of Yahwa and Pil-u are seen accompanied by the mewing of a cat. Kim Chung-won, Pil-u's friend and head of the guardsmen, uses the power of a Buddhist priest to get rid of the ghosts and restore peace to the nation.

Cast 
 Jo Su-hyeon
 Choe Ji-suk
 Jeon Young-ju
 Lee Gang-hui
 Choe Gwang-ho
 Lee Ki-young
 Choe In-suk
 Yun So-ra
 Gang Seong-hui
 Lee Nam-hui
 Park Bu-yang
 Jeon Shook
 Sin Dong-ok
 Lee Jong-cheol
 Ji Bang-yeol

Recognition

External links 
 
 

1970 films
1970 horror films
Films directed by Shin Sang-ok
1970s Korean-language films
South Korean horror films